The ninth and final season of Seinfeld began airing on September 25, 1997, and concluded on May 14, 1998 on NBC.

Production
Seinfeld was produced by Castle Rock Entertainment and distributed by Columbia TriStar Television and was aired on NBC in the US. The executive producers were Larry David, George Shapiro, and Howard West with Tom Gammill and Max Pross as supervising producers. Bruce Kirschbaum was the executive consultant. This season was directed by Andy Ackerman.

The series was set predominantly in an apartment block on New York City's Upper West Side; the ninth season was shot and mostly filmed in CBS Studio Center in Studio City, California. The show features Jerry Seinfeld as himself, and a host of Jerry's friends and acquaintances, which include George Costanza, Elaine Benes, and Cosmo Kramer, portrayed by Jason Alexander, Julia Louis-Dreyfus and Michael Richards, respectively.

Episodes

Reception
The review aggregator website Rotten Tomatoes reported a 61% approval rating with an average rating of 5.9/10, based on 23 critic reviews. The website's critics consensus reads, "In its final season, the cynical show about nothing goes out defiantly on its own terms – even if means alienating fans who may have wanted things to end differently."

References

External links

 
 
 

9
1997 American television seasons
1998 American television seasons